Shih Min-chi (born September 1914) was a Chinese agriculture expert and politician. She was one of the first group of women elected to the Legislative Yuan in 1948.

Biography
Originally from Panyu County in Guangdong, Shih attended Zhixin high school and then studied at Sun Yat-sen University in Guanzhou and the Peking University College of Agriculture. She subsequently worked in the Nanjing Central Agricultural Laboratory, the Cornell University Research Institute and as a technician in the Ministry of Agriculture and Forestry, eventually becoming a professor at Sun Yat-sen University. She also served as headteacher of Jianru Middle School and chair of Aiqun and Dafu primary schools.

She became a member of the central committee of the Ministry of Agriculture and Industry and served as executive director of Guangdong Provincial Farmers' Association. In the 1948 elections to the Legislative Yuan, 18 seats were elected by agricultural organisations, two of which were reserved for women. Shih was one of the two elected, becoming one of the first group of women in the Legislative Yuan. She subsequently relocated to Taiwan during the Chinese Civil War.

References

1914 births
Sun Yat-sen University alumni
National University of Peking alumni
Chinese civil servants
Academic staff of Sun Yat-sen University
Members of the Kuomintang
20th-century Chinese women politicians
Members of the 1st Legislative Yuan
Members of the 1st Legislative Yuan in Taiwan
Year of death missing